Kermia aglaia is a species of sea snail, a marine gastropod mollusk in the family Raphitomidae.

Description
The length of the shell attains 10 mm, its diameter 3 mm.

A graceful, attenuate, fusiform species. The shell contains 11 - 12 whorls, of which 3 - 4 ocher whorls in the protoconch. The protoconch is ochraceous, and beautifully microscopically decussate. The subsequent whorls are ventricose and impressed at the suture. They are spirally crossed by 3 - 4 thick lirae. The whorls are longitudinally ribbed, fourteen on the body whorl. The ribs on the upper whorls are somewhat rougher. The aperture is oblong. The outer lip is thickened and fimbriate. The sinus is broad but not deep. The siphonal canal is produced.

Distribution
This species occurs  in the Persian Gulf.

References

 Melvill, J. C. "Descriptions of twelve new species and one variety of marine Gastropoda from the Persian Gulf, Gulf of Oman, and Arabian Sea, collected by Mr. FW Townsend, 1902-1904.". Journal of Molluscan Studies 6 1904:

External links
 

aglaia
Gastropods described in 1904